The 1982 United States Senate election in Montana took place on November 2, 1982. Incumbent United States Senator John Melcher, who was first elected to the Senate in 1976, opted to run for re-election. He won the Democratic primary after he faced a tough intraparty challenger, and advanced to the general election, where he faced Larry R. Williams, an author and the Republican nominee, and Larry Dodge, the Libertarian nominee. Though his margin was reduced significantly from his initial election, Melcher still comfortably won re-election to his second and final term in the Senate.

Democratic primary

Candidates 
John Melcher, incumbent United States Senator
Michael Bond, housing contractor
Henry Hardy, retired railroad worker

Campaign 
During his first term in the Senate, Melcher's relative conservatism for a Democrat prompted a primary challenger in Michael Bond, a housing contractor who campaigned on his opposition to nuclear war. Bond attacked Melcher for voting to increase spending on nuclear arms, and pledged to reduce military spending to $60 billion and to use the savings to reduce interest rates. During the campaign, Bond came under fire from the state branches of the Veterans of Foreign Wars and the Disabled American Veterans for turning in his draft card in 1967 to protest the Vietnam War, who put out a statement, saying, "There is no place in the U.S. Senate for any draft dodger, draft card burner or draft protester of any kind."

Results

Republican primary

Candidates 
Larry R. Williams, 1978 Republican nominee for the United States Senate
Willie Dee Morris, attorney

Results

General election

Results

See also 
 1982 United States Senate elections

References 

Montana
1982
1982 Montana elections